Bare is a small town in the municipality of Šavnik, Montenegro.

Demographics
According to the 2003 census, the town has a population of 301 people.

According to the 2011 census, its population was 250.

References

Populated places in Šavnik Municipality
Serb communities in Montenegro